Hassan-Ali Fyzee (9 October 1879 – 1 January 1962) was an Indian tennis, badminton, and table tennis player.

Table tennis 
Hassan-Ali Fyzee took part in the first 1926 World Table Tennis Championships in London. Here he won the bronze medal with the Indian men's team, in which also his brother Athar-Ali Fyzee, active in the Davis Cup, played. In 1926, he was president of the Table Tennis Federation of India. At the end of 1926, he took over organizational tasks in the newly founded International Table Tennis Federation as an assessor.

Tennis
Fayzee's career singles match record was 223-116 (65.7%). He first main tournament was at the British Covered Court Championships in London in April 1910 where he reached the quarter finals before losing to Stanley Doust in straight sets. In a career lasting 18 seasons he reached 21 finals winning 10 titles. He won the Herga LTC tournament at Harrow tournament on grass 3 times (1922–23, 1929). He won the Northern Championships in Liverpool on grass in June 1922. He won the Roehampton tournament on clay in June 1923 defeating Nicolae Mișu of Romania in five sets. In July 1923 he won the Midland Counties Championships at Edgbaston on grass. Adaptable on all surfaces he won the Welsh Covered Court Championships at Craigside, Llandudno indoors on wood courts 2 times (1928–31). He also won the North London Hardcourts at Highbury on clay in 1926. His last tournament was at the North London Hardcourts in May 1938.

Davis Cup
From 1921 to 1927, he completed eleven encounters for the Indian Davis Cup team. He won 4 of his 17 singles and 6 of his 11 doubles.

Career Singles titles, (10) and runner up, (11)
Included:

References

External links 
 
 
 

1879 births
1962 deaths
Indian male table tennis players
Indian male tennis players
Racket sportspeople from Mumbai
World Table Tennis Championships medalists
Tyabji family
Sportspeople from British India